Thawra - Um Qalaq  is a Syrian village located in Salamiyah Subdistrict in Salamiyah District, Hama.  According to the Syria Central Bureau of Statistics (CBS), Thawra - Um Qalaq had a population of 272 in the 2004 census.

References 

Populated places in Salamiyah District